Doha Bay is the bay bordering Qatar's capital city of Doha. Doha was established on the south bank of the bay. Landfill has been used to extend and expand the city to the north around the edge of the bay. Doha Port, Corniche Street and the Doha Corniche, Al Rumaila Park and Sheraton Park border the bay. Palm Tree Island is located in the center of the bay.

Description
The United States Hydrographic Office offers a brief description of the bay in 1920: "The shore of the bay from Al Bida turns northward, and is fronted by an extensive reef running out nearly 1¾ miles, which nearly dries. Between this reef and Jazirat as Safla is a narrow channel leading into a basin westward of that island, with from 1½ to 3½ fathoms water."

Sharq Crossing
In 2011, the Sharq Crossing project (formerly known as Doha Bay Crossing) was announced by the Ministry of Municipal Affairs and Urban Planning. Overseen by Ashghal (Public Works Authority), the project plans to construct three interconnected bridges, designed by Santiago Calatrava, over a 10 km crossing connecting West Bay with Hamad International Airport. There will also be two tunnels below the bay. The purpose behind launching the Sharq Crossing programme was to accommodate the rising traffic in Doha and as a preparatory project for the 2022 FIFA World Cup. 

In January 2015, a delay in the $12 billion project was reported. The financial strain of low oil prices may be part of reason for the delay; meanwhile $140 billion is being allocated for other infrastructure ahead of the World Cup event.

References

Doha
Bays of Qatar